Codringtonia elisabethae is a species of air-breathing land snail, a terrestrial pulmonate gastropod mollusc in the family Helicidae, the typical snails.

Geographic distribution
C. elisabethae is endemic to Greece, where it occurs in the north-eastern part of the Peloponnese.

References

Codringtonia
Endemic fauna of Greece
Molluscs of Europe
Gastropods described in 2005